The Avro Canada C102 Jetliner was a Canadian prototype medium-range turbojet-powered jet airliner built by Avro Canada in 1949. It was beaten to the air by only 13 days by the de Havilland Comet, thereby becoming the second jet airliner in the world. The name "Jetliner" was chosen as a shortening of the term "jet airliner", a term which is still in popular usage. The aircraft was considered suitable for busy routes along the US eastern seaboard and garnered intense interest, notably from Howard Hughes who even offered to start production under license. However, continued delays in Avro Canada's all-weather interceptor project, the CF-100 Canuck, led to an order to stop working on the project in 1951, with the prototype Jetliner later cut up for scrap.

Design and development

Genesis

In 1945 Trans-Canada Airlines (TCA) started exploring a number of aircraft developments under the direction of Jim Bain, at that time superintendent of engineering and maintenance. Avro of England, which had recently taken over the Victory Aircraft "shadow factory" in Toronto, jointly with TCA, came up with a layout for an aircraft powered by four Armstrong-Siddeley turboprop engines later known as the Armstrong Siddeley Mamba. This Mamba engine arrangement was used about the same time for the unsuccessful British Armstrong Whitworth Apollo airliner. In the fall of 1945, Bain travelled to England to visit various aircraft companies and  Rolls-Royce, where Ernest Hives, head of the Rolls-Royce Aero Engine, convinced him the AJ65, a new axial-flow turbojet engine later called the Avon, was the right engine for his new aircraft. On his return to Canada Bain insisted a twin-engined aircraft powered by these engines was the only arrangement acceptable to TCA.

Over the next few months, the teams at TCA and Avro refined the requirements, which were signed off on 9 April 1946. The difference between the range and maximum airport distances was to allow for the required 45 minutes stacking and diversion to a 120-mile (190-km)-distant alternate airport in a  headwind. The aircraft also needed to be able to operate from existing  runways. Load was 12,700 lbs and 50 passengers.

The agreement also specified a number of contractual terms that, in retrospect, appear especially odd. In spite of TCA's experience with contracting for the Ministry of Transport, and Bain's personal arguments that cost-plus contracts be used as a ward against budget overruns, TCA's contract with Avro demanded fixed prices for the entire development, as well as a fixed price for the aircraft of C$350,000. Additionally, Avro was not allowed to sell the aircraft to any other airline for three years. After that period, if a buyer paid less than C$350,000 for the aircraft, Avro would have to pay the difference to TCA. Furthermore, during the testing period of one year after the first aircraft was introduced, Avro would have to pay all costs, even if paying passengers were carried. Jack Dyment, chief of TCA's entire engineering department, suggested that Avro pay for the testing so that it would "permit us to learn how to successfully operate a jet aircraft without having to pay for such experience the hard way."

Design changes
In 1947, Fred Smye, president of Avro, advised Herbert James Symington of TCA that they could not meet the fixed price contract. Symington's response was to pull out of the project. C. D. Howe stepped in and offered $1.5 million to continue the project, at a slower pace. At about the same time, Rolls-Royce told Avro that the civil certification of the Avon could not be guaranteed in time for the Jetliner's rollout. This, in turn, would lead to higher operational and maintenance costs. Nevertheless, Avro continued with its plan to build the jet, selecting four Rolls-Royce Derwents to replace the two Avons.

Chief Designer James C. Floyd was upset by these developments, but in the end found a number of advantages to the four-engine layout. The main advantage was that in an engine-out situation, the aircraft would lose only a quarter of its thrust, rather than half. In particular, the asymmetry in thrust originally called for a powered rudder to correct for yaw in the case of an engine failure, but with four engines it was found yaw was so small it could be corrected easily with just the manual trim controls.

Although bearing some resemblance to the jet-powered Avro Tudor 8 and 9 (the former flying on jet power in 1948 and the latter becoming the experimental Avro Ashton first flying in 1950), Floyd's design was conceived from the outset as a commercial jet airliner. The updated design was presented in October 1948, and in February 1948 TCA responded with changes of their own. In April, Gordon McGregor took over the presidency of TCA, and told Smye that he did not want it to be the first airline with a jet. Nevertheless, the project pressed on, and was the topic of a major article in Aviation Week in November.

The aircraft was scheduled to begin deliveries in May 1952, and enter service in October, which would have given it a full six years headstart on the 707, which did not enter service until October 1958, and more than 11 years on its top short-field competitor, the Boeing 727. Its short-field performance exceeded the Caravelles (with a comparable number of passengers).

Proposals exist for 30-, 40-, and 50-seat models, as well as 52- and 64-seat paratroop versions, high-altitude medical lab, photo reconnaissance, cargo, and crew trainer types.

Operational history

Two years later, the first prototype, CF-EJD (-X), began taxiing tests, and first flew on 10 August 1949, only 25 months after the design had started, and only 13 days after the first flight of the DH Comet. Delays to the first flight were caused by many burst tires as the anti-skid braking system had not yet been fitted for the high-speed taxi trials which included braking tests and steering control checks. These high speed runs had to be done on a shorter runway than had been planned as the Department of Transport had taken the longer runway out of service for rework at the last minute. On its second flight, on 16 August, the landing gear failed to extend, and the Jetliner had to make a belly landing. However, the damage was minor, and the aircraft was in the air again in three weeks.

During its first inspection in November the servo rudder was removed as unnecessary but the servo elevators were retained for dealing with extreme centre-of-gravity positions.

In April 1950, the Jetliner carried the world's first jet airmail from Toronto to New York City in 58 minutes– half the previous record (c. 340 miles, 352 mph). The flight was highly publicized and the crew was welcomed with a ticker tape parade through the streets of Manhattan. So new was the concept of jet power that the Jetliner was made to park far from the terminal, and pans were placed under the engines in case they dripped any "self-igniting fuel." On its return the next day, the Jetliner returned to Canada via Montreal.

At the time, in the mid-1950s, the Cold War was starting and the Canadian authorities were in the midst of expanding the military. Avro was involved in designing the first dedicated jet-powered, all-weather fighter for the RCAF, the Avro Canada CF-100 Canuck. The project was somewhat delayed, although the company's continuing work on the Jetliner caused some controversy. After the prototype returned, it still had no immediate sales prospects, and C.D. Howe (the "minister of everything") therefore ordered the program stopped in December 1951. The second prototype Jetliner, nearly completed in the main assembly hangar, was broken up at that time.

Nevertheless, only a few months later, the enigmatic Howard Hughes first learned of the design and leased the Jetliner prototype for testing, flying it for a few circuits when it arrived in Culver City, California. He tried to buy 30 Jetliners for use by TWA, but Avro had to repeatedly turn him down due to limited manufacturing capabilities and overwork on the CF-100 project. Hughes then started looking at US companies to build it for him; Convair proved interested and started studies on gearing up a production line. C.D. Howe again stepped in and insisted that Avro concentrate on its Orenda turbojet and CF-100 jet fighter programs. Furthermore, the U.S. government decided that Convair's military commitments had priority for facilities over any additional civil projects.

The project was almost restarted in 1953, when CF-100 production was in full swing, but this never happened. In 1955, TCA ordered 51 Vickers Viscount turboprop aircraft from Vickers-Armstrong in England. These were the first turbine-powered aircraft in regular service in North America. They continued in service until 1974.

Cancellation
The Jetliner was later used for taking in-flight photographs of CF-100 development trials such as canopy jettison and rocket firing. On 10 December 1956, the Jetliner was grounded and ordered not to fly again. It was donated to the National Research Council but they had no room to store it and took only the nose section for cockpit layout design. The rest of the Jetliner was cut up on 13 December 1956. The only surviving parts are the nose and cockpit section in the Canada Aviation and Space Museum in Ottawa, Ontario.

Legacy

Canada Post issued a stamp to commemorate the development of the Jetliner. Jetliner Road in Mississauga, Ontario is named for the airliner at Toronto Pearson International Airport. The  "Avro Jetliner Private" street name also commemorates the aircraft at Ottawa Macdonald–Cartier International Airport.

Specifications Avro C102 Jetliner

See also

References

Notes

Bibliography

 Campagna, Palmiro. Requiem for a Giant. Toronto: Dundurn Press, 2003. .
 Floyd, Jim. The Avro Canada C102 Jetliner. Erin, Ontario: Boston Mills Press, 1986. .
 McArthur, Scott, ed. "Testing the Avro Jetliner." Arrow Recovery Canada, transcript of speech by Avro Canada C102 Jetliner test pilot Don Rogers, 2003. Retrieved: 27 June 2009.
 Milberry, Larry. Aviation In Canada. Toronto: McGraw-Hill Ryerson Ltd., 1979. .
 Winchester, Jim. "Avro Canada Jetliner." X-Planes and Prototypes. London: Amber Books Ltd., 2005. .

External links

 Photos of the Avro Canada C-102 "Jetliner" (Canada Aviation Museum)
 Woe Canada: The only thing that kept Canada from beating the U.S. to a jet airliner was Canada, By Graham Chandler, Air & Space Magazine, 1 March 2009
 Avroland: The Avro C.102 Jetliner
 Arrow Recovery Canada: Avro Jetliner
 Avro Canada Jetliner
 The AVRO Jetliner – America's First Jet Transport – a 1950 Flight advertisement for the AVRO Jetliner
 "Jetliner's First Flight" a 1949 Flight news item

C102
1940s Canadian airliners
Quadjets
Low-wing aircraft
Abandoned civil aircraft projects
Aviation history of Canada
Aircraft first flown in 1949